Kaitemako is a rural area in the Western Bay of Plenty District and Bay of Plenty Region of New Zealand's North Island. The area includes the Kaitemako Stream catchment. The highest point is Pukunui at 364 metres. The Kaiate Falls (Te Rerekawau Falls) are a pair of waterfalls, with the lower fall being about 15 metres high.

Demographics

Kaitemako had a population of 1,752 at the 2018 New Zealand census, an increase of 279 people (18.9%) since the 2013 census, and an increase of 411 people (30.6%) since the 2006 census. There were 606 households, comprising 891 males and 864 females, giving a sex ratio of 1.03 males per female. The median age was 43.8 years (compared with 37.4 years nationally), with 339 people (19.3%) aged under 15 years, 300 (17.1%) aged 15 to 29, 885 (50.5%) aged 30 to 64, and 228 (13.0%) aged 65 or older.

Ethnicities were 85.4% European/Pākehā, 20.4% Māori, 1.4% Pacific peoples, 2.6% Asian, and 1.4% other ethnicities. People may identify with more than one ethnicity.

The percentage of people born overseas was 16.6, compared with 27.1% nationally.

Although some people chose not to answer the census's question about religious affiliation, 54.8% had no religion, 32.0% were Christian, 4.3% had Māori religious beliefs, 0.2% were Hindu, 0.7% were Buddhist and 2.1% had other religions.

Of those at least 15 years old, 285 (20.2%) people had a bachelor's or higher degree, and 219 (15.5%) people had no formal qualifications. The median income was $35,400, compared with $31,800 nationally. 285 people (20.2%) earned over $70,000 compared to 17.2% nationally. The employment status of those at least 15 was that 765 (54.1%) people were employed full-time, 258 (18.3%) were part-time, and 39 (2.8%) were unemployed.

References

Western Bay of Plenty District
Populated places in the Bay of Plenty Region